Ḥakīma bint Muḥammad al-Jawād also known as Ḥakīma Khātūn or Lady Hakima was the daughter of Imam Muhammad al-Jawad, and the aunt of Imam Hasan al-Askari. She is a prominent narrator in Shia hadith and history, especially for her narration of the birth of Imam Muhammad al-Mahdi.

See also
 Narjis

References
The Expected Mahdi

External links
The Life of Imam Muhammad al-Jawad
The Ninth Imam
Imam al-Jawwad

9th-century women from the Abbasid Caliphate
Family of Muhammad
Arab women
Shia Muslims
9th-century Arabs